The spider species Nephila senegalensis is commonly known as the banded-legged golden orb-web spider. The name comes from the fact that the joints of the spider are typically coloured a golden yellow. It is common throughout much of sub-Saharan Africa, from Senegal and Yemen to South Africa. Males are much smaller than females. These spiders are diurnal and weave impressive webs.

Subspecies
Nephila senegalensis annulata (Thorell, 1859)
Nephila senegalensis bragantina Brito Capello, 1867
Nephila senegalensis hildebrandti Dahl, 1912
Nephila senegalensis huebneri Dahl, 1912
Nephila senegalensis keyserlingi (Blackwall, 1865)
Nephila senegalensis nyikae Pocock, 1898
Nephila senegalensis schweinfurthi Simon, 1890

References

Araneidae
Spiders of Africa
Spiders described in 1842